A nibbler, or nibblers, is a tool for cutting sheet metal with minimal distortion. They may be used for nibbling. One type operates much like a punch and die, with a blade that moves in a linear fashion against a fixed die, removing small bits of metal and leaving a kerf approximately 6 mm wide.  Another type operates similar to tin snips, but shears the sheet along two parallel tracks 3–6 mm apart, rolling up the waste in a tight spiral as it cuts.  Nibblers may be manual (hand operated) or powered.

Power nibblers are often powered by compressed air, though electrical types also exist. A common DIY nibbler tool is an electric drill attachment, which converts the rotary motion of the drill into a reciprocating motion of the jaw.

References 

Cutting tools
Metalworking cutting tools
Fabrication (metal)